Elevenmile Creek is a river on Douglas Island in the City and Borough of Juneau (CBJ), Alaska, United States.

The name refers to the stream's location, between the ten- and eleven-mile markers of the North Douglas Highway.</ref>

A chemical water quality record for the stream dates to 1967.  A 1986 panning of water from Elevenmile Creek exhibited a small amount of lead.

A wood harvest area owned by the state of Alaska extends south of the highway from Cove Creek to Elevenmile Creek.  The stream also runs through CBJ-owned land.

See also
Fish Creek and Ninemile Creek are nearby streams on Douglas Island.

References

Rivers of Juneau, Alaska
Rivers of Alaska